Íþróttafélagið Grótta (English: Grótta Sports Club) is an Icelandic sports club based in the town of Seltjarnarnes, in the Capital Region. The club is best known for its women's handball team that won the national championship in 2015 and 2016, but also has departments for gymnastics, football and powerlifting.

History
Grótta was officially founded on 24 April 1967 by Garðar Guðmundsson, a football supporter from Seltjarnarnes who had begun the process of forming a club the previous year. Initially the club had only a football team but later expanded to include handball (1969), gymnastics (1985) and powerlifting (2013). The club has over the years tried to incorporate sports including basketball, skiing and chess but they have all failed.

On 24 April 2007, the club held a festival to celebrate the 40th anniversary of its foundation. The day included a parade through the town with a brass band, displays by the club's various teams, addresses by the mayor and chairman and a gala.

Football

Home court
The football team plays its home matches at the Vivaldi stadium, which has an artificial grass playing surface and a capacity of 300 spectators.

Men's team

History
In 2007, the men's football team was promoted to the 2. deild karla after defeating BÍ/Bolungarvík 5–1 on aggregate in the play-offs. In 2010, the side won promotion to the 1. deild karla and remained there for two seasons before returning to the third tier for the 2012 campaign. It returned to the 1. deild in 2017 but were relegated straight away. However, they won promotion again the following year. In 2019 they then produced what has been referred to as one of the most surprising seasons in Icelandic football history when they won the 1. deild and were promoted to the top tier of Icelandic football for the first time in the club's history.

Honours
 1. deild karla:
2019
 2. deild karla:
2009
 3. deild karla:
1991

Current squad

Women's team

Notable managers
 Bryndís Valsdóttir

Handball

Women's team

Honours
 Úrvalsdeild kvenna (2):
2015, 2016
 Icelandic Women's Handball Cup:
2015

Notable players
 Lovísa Thompson 2014–2018

Men's team

Notable players
 Alexander Petersson 1998–2003
 Gintaras Savukynas 2003–2004
 Guðjón Valur Sigurðsson 1991–1998
 Viggó Kristjánsson 2010–2016

Gymnastics
Around 1200 participants are in the Gymnastics department. Around 20% are from Seltjarnarnes and 80% are from the neighboring town of Reykjavík. Both Artistic gymnastics and TeamGym are taught at the club. Olympic gold medalist Szilveszter Csollány was hired as a coach in 2011.

In 2016-2019 the Gymnastics department went under major reconstruction where the house was rebuilt bigger and new equipment was bought which has greatly improved the facilities for the participants.

References

External links
Grótta official website

 
Football clubs in Iceland
Multi-sport clubs in Iceland
Association football clubs established in 1967
1967 establishments in Iceland